James Webster Hill (born October 21, 1946) is a Los Angeles-based sportscaster and currently lead sports anchor and sports director at KCBS-TV. He is a former American football defensive back who played in the National Football League.

Football career
Hill played college football at Texas A&I University (now Texas A&M University–Kingsville). Prior to becoming a sportscaster, Hill played professionally in the National Football League for the San Diego Chargers, Green Bay Packers, and Cleveland Browns.

Broadcasting career
During his first season as a Green Bay Packers player in 1972, Hill started his broadcasting career as a contributor to the Monday and Tuesday evening newscasts of Green Bay station WBAY-TV; as the primary affiliate of the CBS-TV Network in Green Bay at the time, WBAY-TV carried most Packers games during the 1970s. 

After retiring from the NFL, Hill started in 1976 at KCBS-TV (then KNXT) in Los Angeles, where he was a sports anchor for 11 years. Hill began on the NFL on CBS in 1980 as an analyst. But in 1984, 1985, and 1992–93, he was the play-by-play announcer on selected games.  He also served as Sideline Reporter for CBS Sports's coverage of Super Bowl XVIII (1984).  He left KCBS in 1987, and spent a near five-year stint at rival KABC-TV, where he anchored the sports segments on its 5, 6, and 11 p.m. newscasts. He also worked for ABC Sports's coverage of the 1988 Winter Olympics as a Correspondent in Calgary and as Sideline Reporter for the Super Bowl XXII (1988). He returned to KCBS in March 1992, and has remained there since.  In addition to KCBS-TV duties, Hill files sports reports for sister station KCAL-TV.  Hill is also one of the hosts for pay-per-view boxing telecasts produced by the Showtime cable network.

A popular broadcast personality in Southern California for years, Hill has been active in community activities.  He is a member of the Los Angeles Urban League's board of directors, as well as serving on the board of directors of the Grossman Burn Center in Sherman Oaks, California.  He is a spokesman for the City of Los Angeles Department of Recreation and Parks and is involved in developing youth outreach and fitness programs.

Honors
Hill has been honored by the Associated Press, Los Angeles Press Club, United Press International, the California Press Television and Radio Association, and USA Today for his outstanding work in sports reporting.

Hill was honored on May 9, 2006, with the 2,311th star on the Hollywood Walk of Fame.  Colleagues, friends, family and dignitaries such as Los Angeles mayor Antonio Villaraigosa were in attendance to honor the popular sportscaster.  Mayor Villaraigosa declared May 9, 2006, in Los Angeles as "Jim Hill Day."

Personal life
Hill is an avid golfer who often plays at Wilson & Harding Golf Courses at Griffith Park in Los Angeles. He also plays golf with Ernie Camacho. 

He was formerly married to Erma White (1965–1973).  Hill has one son, Walter J. Hill, San Antonio, Texas.  He is divorced from actress Denise Nicholas.  

His younger brother is former Los Angeles Rams tight end David Hill.

He has appeared as himself in movies and television shows such as Rocky III and Arli$$.

Partial filmography
Polyester (1981) - Picket Reporter
Rocky III (1982) - Sportscaster

References

External links 
Jim Hill's bio on CBSLosAngeles.com

KCBS-TV: Our Jim Hill Honored With Star on Walk of Fame (also contains two videos)

American sports announcers
San Diego Chargers players
Green Bay Packers players
1946 births
Television anchors from Los Angeles
Living people
Olympic Games broadcasters
Sportspeople from San Antonio
Texas A&M–Kingsville Javelinas football players
National Football League announcers
National Basketball Association broadcasters
Boxing commentators
Players of American football from San Antonio